Return of the Bastards is a 2003 Greek exploitation film directed by Fokionas Bogris and starring Apostolos Souglakos, Christos Natsios, Nikos Tsachiridis and Fay Demani.

External links

2003 films
2000s Greek-language films
2000s exploitation films
Greek thriller films